Membership in the National Football League (NFL) is certified by a franchise. A franchise is awarded by the league to each member club, and serves as the league's authorization to operate as a professional football club in their city. Franchises award member clubs the exclusive right to hold professional football games between league members within a 75-mile radius of their city, as well as the exclusive rights to market games in their area.

There are currently 32 clubs in the league, with any new members only being approved with the support of three-quarters of current members. In the event of egregious misconduct, the League Commissioner has the power to suspend or revoke a club's franchise.

The NFL has had 49 franchises become defunct over its history, including ten of the league's twelve charter franchises: only the Chicago Bears and Arizona Cardinals survive to the present day.  Neither of these teams play in the same city as they did in 1920 - during the NFL's inaugural season it was the Cardinals who called Chicago home while the Bears (then called the Staleys) played in Decatur, a city about 155 miles southwest of Chicago.

Often, when an NFL team went defunct, the franchise was not simply contracted. Folding franchises were often replaced by new franchises, typically in another city and under different ownership, which were then assigned the player contracts and other assets of the defunct team.

In the NFL's early years, its teams were essentially gate-driven enterprises which relied on ticket sales to remain solvent. Baseball was by far the most popular sport and even within American football the NFL often struggled to compete with college football for an audience, much of which was still reluctant to accept professionalism in football. Moreover, the strict capitalization requirements and related measures taken by the NFL and other major professional sports leagues in the 21st century did not exist in the early NFL, its predecessors and early rivals. Instead, owners often simply paid team expenses out of pocket as they arose. In such circumstances, a community-owned club like the Green Bay Packers would quickly face bankruptcy if revenues were insufficient to meet team expenses, while the owners of privately-held teams often did not have the patience and/or financial resources to underwrite substantial losses.

While the NFL expanded to 22 franchises by 1926, at a league meeting in April 1927, the decision was made to revoke the franchises of 10 clubs in weak financial situations. While the NFL was originally primarily based in smaller cities, as teams in larger markets such as Detroit, New York City and Philadelphia became established most teams in smaller markets found it impossible to remain competitive and profitable. A few of these teams moved to larger cities, while most eventually folded outright.

Five of these defunct NFL franchises (the Akron Pros/Indians, Canton Bulldogs, Cleveland Bulldogs/Indians, Frankford Yellow Jackets, and Providence Steam Rollers) won NFL championships before they folded. 

However, even before the Texans had played their last game, the NFL had awarded a new franchise to an ownership group in Baltimore which acquired the Texans' player contracts and other assets. The most recent NFL team to be outright contracted and not continue to exist in any meaningful way as the organization of another franchise was the original Baltimore Colts, a former All-America Football Conference team which folded after one NFL season . The NFL elected to contract the original Colts in part to eliminate the awkward scheduling that had arisen from having an odd number of teams in the league.

Within a few years of the original Texans' demise, the NFL was rapidly growing in popularity, resulting in massive revenue growth both in gate receipts and new sources of income, especially from television broadcasting rights. This eventually resulted in the establishment of the rival American Football League, which despite some initial instability achieved the extremely rare distinction of being a league in which no teams folded throughout its history. The AFL's success resulted in the NFL agreeing to a merger which was completed in 1970. Since the merger, the NFL has grown to become the world's richest sports league, primarily due to its lucrative television contracts. While ticket sales remain a significant source of income for teams, the league nevertheless proved it can forego most of this revenue for at least one season without causing serious financial stress when it played the 2020 season mostly behind closed doors or in front of limited crowds at the height of the COVID-19 pandemic. While there have been a few instances since the merger in which owners have come under controversy and/or financial distress, these matters have been resolved by the sale of the affected franchise as opposed to its revocation.

Finally, there have been several occasions where NFL franchises have temporarily merged their teams and/or suspended operations without folding outright, such as during World War II when there was a shortage of players. NFL franchises are not considered to have been defunct during any inactive periods, and while the records of the wartime merged teams are kept separately from their parent franchises, these are not considered NFL franchises in their own right. The most recent franchise to suspend operations was the Cleveland Browns, who were deactivated after the  season as an alternative to owner Art Modell's original proposal to move the Browns to Baltimore.

Defunct franchises

See also
 National Football League franchise moves and mergers
 Steagles
 Card-Pitt
 List of defunct and relocated Major League Baseball teams
 List of defunct National Basketball Association teams
 List of defunct and relocated National Hockey League teams
 Major League Soccer defunct clubs

Notes

References

General

Specific

External links
 National Football League

 
National Football League
Defunct